Peeter Simm (born 24 February 1953 in Kiviõli) is an Estonian film director.

In 1976 he graduated from All-Union State Institute of Cinematography (VGIK).

Selected filmography
Ideaalmaastik (1980)
Fed up! (2005)
On the Other Side of Leprosy (2006)
Georg (2007)
Circulation of the Blood (2011)
Lonely Island (2012)
Englas. Old Warrior (2015)
Koma (2018)
Taagepera (2019)
Vangis ja vabaduses (2019)
On the Water (2020)

References

1953 births
Living people
Estonian film directors
Estonian screenwriters
Recipients of the Order of the White Star, 5th Class
People from Kiviõli